Paopi 1 - Coptic Calendar - Paopi 3

The second day of the Coptic month of Paopi, the second month of the Coptic year. On a common year, this day corresponds to September 29, of the Julian Calendar, and October 12, of the Gregorian Calendar. This day falls in the Coptic season of Akhet, the season of inundation.

Commemorations 

 The arrival of Saint Severus of Antioch, in Egypt

References 

Days of the Coptic calendar